Jeetmal Khant (1 January 1963 – 24 May 2021) was an Indian politician from the Bharatiya Janata Party.

Biography
He was a member of the Rajasthan Legislative Assembly representing the Garhi Vidhan Sabha constituency of Rajasthan.

Khant died from COVID-19.

References 

2021 deaths
People from Banswara district
Deaths from the COVID-19 pandemic in India
Bharatiya Janata Party politicians from Rajasthan
Rajasthan MLAs 2013–2018
1963 births